Events from the year 1936 in the United Kingdom.

This year is notable for the death of George V early in the year, the accession of his son Edward VIII to the throne and his subsequent abdication, resulting in the accession to the throne of his younger brother George VI (previously Albert, Duke of York).

Incumbents

 Monarch – George V (until 20 January), Edward VIII (starting 20 January, until 11 December), George VI (starting 11 December)
 Prime Minister – Stanley Baldwin (Coalition)
 Parliament – 37th

Events
 4 January – England celebrates its first ever win over the All Blacks in rugby union, in particular the two famous tries by "The Prince" HH Alexander Obolensky.
 13 January – GPO Film Unit documentary Night Mail, incorporating poetry by W. H. Auden and music by Benjamin Britten, is premiered at the Cambridge Arts Theatre.
 20 January – King George V dies at Sandringham House, Norfolk, aged 70. His eldest son, The Prince Edward, Prince of Wales succeeds as King Edward VIII.
 21 January – King Edward VIII breaks royal protocol by watching the proclamation of his own accession to the throne from a window of St. James's Palace, in the company of the still-married Wallis Simpson.
 February – John Maynard Keynes's book The General Theory of Employment, Interest and Money is published.
 6–16 February – Great Britain and Northern Ireland compete at the Winter Olympics in Garmisch-Partenkirchen, Germany, and win 1 gold, 1 silver and 1 bronze medals.
 5 March – first test flight of the Supermarine Spitfire, from Eastleigh Aerodrome.
 11 April – Billy Butlin opens his first Butlins holiday camp, Butlins Skegness in Skegness (Ingoldmells), Lincolnshire. It is officially opened by Amy Johnson.
 18 April – Ordnance Survey begins the retriangulation of Great Britain with its first triangulation station near Cold Ashby, Northamptonshire.
 17 May – barquentine Waterwitch is laid up at Par, Cornwall, the last square rigged ship to trade under sail alone in British ownership.
 22 May – J. H. Thomas resigns from politics for leaking Budget proposals.
 27 May – the  leaves Southampton on her maiden voyage to New York.
 28 May  – Alan Turing submits his paper "On Computable Numbers" to the London Mathematical Society for publication, introducing the concept of the Turing machine. It is formally published on 12 November.
 3 July
 Short Empire flying boat makes first flight, from Rochester, Kent.
 Fred Perry wins his third successive men's singles tennis title at The Championships, Wimbledon, the last British player to win this title until 2013. This year he also wins his third U.S. National Championship, the last Grand Slam victory for a British men's player until 2012, and turns professional.
 16 July – George McMahon tries to shoot King Edward VIII during the Trooping the Colour ceremony.
 24 July – the General Post Office introduces the speaking clock.
 27 July – opening of new swimming pool at Morecambe, claimed to be the largest open-air example in Europe.
 28 July – Great Britain wins the 1936 International Lawn Tennis Challenge at Wimbledon, the last British victory in what becomes the Davis Cup until 2015. 
 31 July – Public Health Act empowers local authorities to make byelaws regulating building construction.
 1–16 August – Great Britain and Northern Ireland compete at the Olympics in Berlin and win 4 gold, 7 silver and 3 bronze medals.
 6 August – an underground explosion at Wharncliffe Woodmoor Colliery in South Yorkshire kills 58.
 26 August – signing of the Anglo-Egyptian Treaty which requires the withdrawal of British troops and recognises Egypt as a sovereign state.
 31 August – Elizabeth Cowell becomes the first female British television presenter making a broadcast from Alexandra Palace.
 8 September – arson attack on a bombing school building at Penyberth on the Llŷn Peninsula as part of the Tân yn Llŷn campaign led by Saunders Lewis, Lewis Valentine and D.J. Williams of the Welsh nationalist group Plaid Genedlaethol Cymru.
 30 September – official opening of Pinewood Studios.
 4 October – Battle of Cable Street between Oswald Mosley's British Union of Fascists and anti-fascist demonstrators.
 5–31 October – Jarrow March: 207 miners march from Jarrow to London in a protest against unemployment and poverty.
 20 October – Prime minister Stanley Baldwin confronts King Edward VIII about his relationship with Wallis Simpson.
 22 October – Dod Orsborne, captain of the fishing vessel Girl Pat, which had caused a media sensation when it went missing, is convicted of its theft and given a prison sentence.
 27 October – Wallis Simpson divorces Ernest Aldrich Simpson, removing the legal barrier to her marrying Edward VIII.
 2 November – BBC launch world's first regular television service, initially alternating between the 240-line Baird electromechanical and the Marconi-EMI all-electronic 405-line television systems.
 6 November – Terence Rattigan's comedy French Without Tears premieres in London.
 12 November – Alan Turing's paper "On Computable Numbers" is formally presented to the London Mathematical Society, introducing the concept of the "Turing machine".
 16 November – King Edward VIII informs Stanley Baldwin of his intention to marry Wallis Simpson. Baldwin responds by informing the King that any woman he married would have to become Queen, and the British public would not accept Wallis Simpson as Queen. The King tells Mr Baldwin that he is prepared to abdicate if the government opposes his marriage.
 25 November – the King tells Stanley Baldwin that he would be prepared to conduct a morganatic marriage with Mrs Simpson, which would allow him to carry on as King but not install Mrs Simpson as Queen. Stanley Baldwin informs him that this would not be accepted either (such a thing has never been known in British laws).
 27 November – Stanley Baldwin raises the issue of a morganatic marriage in the Cabinet, where it is rejected outright.
 30 November – the Crystal Palace is destroyed in a fire.

 December – Henry Hallett Dale wins the Nobel Prize in Physiology or Medicine jointly with Otto Loewi "for their discoveries relating to chemical transmission of nerve impulses".
 1 December – Alfred Blunt, Bishop of Bradford, makes a speech which inadvertently leads to the abdication crisis becoming public in the British media.
 2 December – Stanley Baldwin confirms in a meeting with the King that a morganatic marriage would not be accepted, and in order to marry Mrs Simpson the King would have to abdicate.
 9 December – a KLM (Netherlands airline) Douglas DC-2 airliner crashes in Purley shortly after takeoff from Croydon Airport, killing 14 (including Juan de la Cierva and Admiral Arvid Lindman) with just two survivors. 
 10 December – abdication crisis: the King signs an instrument of abdication at Fort Belvedere in the presence of his three brothers, The Duke of York, The Duke of Gloucester and The Duke of Kent.
 11 December
 Parliament passes His Majesty's Declaration of Abdication Act 1936, providing the legislative authority for the King to abdicate.
 The King performs his last act as sovereign by giving royal assent to the Act.
 Prince Albert, Duke of York, becomes King, ruling as King George VI. His daughter, Princess Elizabeth, becomes heir presumptive.
 The abdicated King Edward VIII, now the Prince Edward, makes a broadcast to the nation explaining his decision to abdicate. He leaves the country for Austria.
 The Oireachtas of the Irish Free State passes the Constitution (Amendment No. 27) Act 1936, removing most powers from the office of Governor-General of the Irish Free State, and the Executive Authority (External Relations) Act 1936 assenting to the abdication and restricting the power of the monarch in relation to Ireland to international affairs.
 18 December – Public Order Act prevents wearing of political uniforms with effect from 1 January next. 
 25 December – Princess Alexandra of Kent, daughter of The Duke and Duchess of Kent, is born in London. This will be the last royal birth attended by the Home Secretary, in this case, John Simon, 1st Viscount Simon.

Date unknown
 K6 red telephone box introduced, together with GPO 'Jubilee concession' to provide one in every village with a post office.
 Peter Jones (department store) in London, designed by William Crabtree, is completed as a pioneering example in the UK of glass curtain wall architecture.

Publications
 The Left Book Club is founded by Stafford Cripps, Victor Gollancz, John Strachey and Harold Laski.
 Eric Ambler's novel The Dark Frontier.
 W. H. Auden's poems Look, Stranger!.
 A. J. Ayer's philosophical study Language, Truth, and Logic.
 Alfred Bestall's text comic The New Adventures of Rupert, the first Rupert Bear annual.
 Agatha Christie's Hercule Poirot novels The A.B.C. Murders, Murder in Mesopotamia and Cards on the Table.
 T. S. Eliot's Collected Poems 1909–35, including "Burnt Norton", first of the Four Quartets.
 Djuna Barnes's novel Nightwood.
 The Geographers' Map Co.'s first A to Z Atlas and Guide to London and the Suburbs.
 Aldous Huxley's novel Eyeless in Gaza.
 Michael Innes' novel Death at the President's Lodging.
 John Maynard Keynes' book The General Theory of Employment, Interest and Money.
 F. R. Leavis’ critical work Revaluation: tradition & development in English poetry.
 A. E. W. Mason's historical adventure novel Fire Over England.
 H. J. Massingham's English Downland and Hugh Quigley's The Highlands of Scotland, first in Batsford's The Face of Britain series.
 Lancashire: cradle of our prosperity and Warwickshire: Shakespeare's country, first in The King's England series edited by Arthur Mee.
 George Orwell's novel Keep the Aspidistra Flying.
 Michael Roberts edits the anthology The Faber Book of Modern Verse.
 Dylan Thomas’ Twenty-five Poems, including "And death shall have no dominion".
 W. B. Yeats edits the anthology The Oxford Book of Modern Verse 1892–1935.

Births
 7 January – Hunter Davies, Scottish-born author and journalist
 8 January – Dennis Gillespie, Scottish footballer (died 2001)
 12 January – Sir William McAlpine, 6th Baronet, engineering construction executive (died 2018)
 20 January – Frances Shand Kydd, mother of Diana, Princess of Wales (died 2004)
 28 January – Bill Jordan, economist and politician
 29 January – Patrick Caulfield, painter and printmaker (died 2005)
 7 February 
 William Bennett, flautist (died 2022)
 Keith Rowlands, rugby union player (died 2006)
 9 February – Clive Swift, actor (died 2019)
 18 February – Philip Jones Griffiths, photojournalist (died 2008)
 24 February – Lance Reventlow, playboy, entrepreneur and racing driver (died 1972)
 13 March
 Michael Davies, writer on Roman Catholicism (died 2004)
 Mary Susan McIntosh, sociologist, feminist, political activist and campaigner for lesbian and gay rights (died 2013)
 26 March – John Malcolm, actor (died 2008)
 28 March – Peter Mayer, publisher (died 2018 in the US)
 3 April – Tony Garnett, television producer (died 2020)
 7 April – Peter Eckersley, television producer (died 1981)
 10 April – John Howell, Olympic long jumper
 21 April – Edna Savage, singer (died 2000)
 24 April – Vera Rich, poet and translator (died 2009)
 9 May
 Terry Downes, middleweight boxer (died 2017) 
 Albert Finney, actor (died 2019)
 Glenda Jackson, actress and politician
 13 May – Matt Simpson, poet (died 2009)
 15 May – Ralph Steadman, caricaturist
 16 May – Roy Hudd, comedy performer (died 2020)
 23 May
 Tom Burlison, footballer and trade unionist (died 2008)
 Robert Sangster, racehorse owner (died 2004)
 26 May – David Stevens, Baron Stevens of Ludgate, politician
 27 May – Eric Anderson, Scottish-born teacher, Provost of Eton College (died 2020)
 2 June – Richard Harries, Baron Harries of Pentregarth, bishop and theologian
 7 June – Chris Bryant, screenwriter (died 2008)
 17 June – Ken Loach, film director
 22 June
 Dick Huddart, English-Australian professional rugby league footballer (died 2021)
 Derek Porter, English footballer
 23 June – Gordon Lewis, Welsh rugby union and professional rugby league footballer
 24 June – Tony Brown, cricketer and administrator (died 2020)
 26 June – Robert Maclennan, Baron Maclennan of Rogart, Scottish politician (died 2020)
 28 June – Malcolm Harding, English-born Canadian Anglican bishop
 30 June – Malcolm Hickman, English cricketer
 3 July – Anthony Lester, barrister and politician (died 2020)
 5 July – James Mirrlees, Scottish economist and winner of the 1996 Nobel Memorial Prize in Economic Sciences (died 2018)
 7 July – Christopher Mallaby, diplomat
 8 July – Tony Warren, television screenwriter (died 2016)
 9 July – Richard Wilson, Scottish actor and director
 11 July – John Stride, actor (died 2018)
 16 July – Mary Parkinson, journalist and television presenter
 20 July – John Sillett, football player and manager (died 2021)
 26 July – Mary Millar, actress (died 1998)
 30 July – Ted Rogers, comedian and game show host (died 2001)
 1 August
 W. D. Hamilton, evolutionary biologist (died 2000) 
 Donald Neilson, serial killer known as the "Black Panther" (died 2011)
 2 August
 Christopher Hogg, business executive (died 2021)
 Anthony Payne, composer (died 2021)
 3 August – Edward Petherbridge, actor, writer and artist
 7 August – Brian Barry, philosopher (died 2009)
 8 August – Jan Pieńkowski, author and artist (born in Poland; died 2022)
 11 August – Jim Thompson, Anglican bishop (died 2003)
 14 August – Trevor Bannister, actor (died 2011)
 17 August – Arthur Rowe, Olympic shot putter (died 2003)
 24 August – A. S. Byatt, novelist and poet
 3 September – Mike Ellis, hammer thrower
 11 September – Brian Plummer, writer and dog breeder (died 2003)
 10 September – Michael Hartshorn, British-New Zealand organic chemist (died 2017)
 14 September – Nicol Williamson, actor (died 2011)
 17 October – Dolores Mantez, actress (died 2012)
 19 September – Anna Karen, actress
 1 October
 Duncan Edwards, footballer (died 1958)
  John Gray, diplomat (died 2003)
 4 October – Giles Radice, politician (died 2022)
 21 October – Simon Gray, playwright (died 2008)
 24 October – Bill Wyman, rock bassist
 25 October – Martin Gilbert, historian (died 2015)
 30 October – George Sassoon, scientist and writer (died 2006)
 2 November – Eddie Colman, footballer (died 1958)
 8 November – Bob Holman, Christian socialist (died 2016)
 16 November – Geoffrey Thompson, businessman (died 2004)
 22 November – John Bird, satiric actor (died 2022)
 23 November – Robert Barnard, writer, critic and lecturer (died 2013)
 16 December – Maurice Setters, footballer (died 2020)
 17 December – Tommy Steele, actor and singer
 21 December – Peter Tinniswood, scriptwriter (died 2003)
 22 December – James Burke, broadcaster, science historian, author and television producer
 25 December – Princess Alexandra of Kent, daughter of The Duke and Duchess of Kent

Deaths
 18 January – Rudyard Kipling, writer, Nobel Prize laureate (born 1865 in British India)
 20 January – King George V (born 1865)
 2 March – Princess Victoria Melita of Saxe-Coburg and Gotha, granddaughter of Queen Victoria (born 1876 in Malta; died in Germany)
 30 April – A. E. Housman, poet (born 1859)
 14 May – Edmund Allenby, 1st Viscount Allenby, Field-Marshal (born 1861)
 4 June –  Mathilde Verne, pianist and educator (born 1865)
 14 June – G. K. Chesterton, writer (born 1874)
 25 July – Sir Henry Wellcome, pharmaceutical entrepreneur and philanthropist (born 1853 in the United States)
 21 September – Frank Hornby, inventor, businessman and politician (born 1863)
 14 October – Edmond Holmes, educationalist, writer and poet (born 1850 in Ireland)
 2 November – Martin Lowry, chemist (born 1874)
 11 November – Sir Edward German, composer (born 1862)
 10 December – Bobby Abel, cricketer (born 1857)
 29 December – Lucy, Lady Houston, political activist, suffragette, philanthropist and promoter of aviation (born 1857)

See also
 List of British films of 1936

References

 
Years of the 20th century in the United Kingdom